Kedzie is an 'L' station on the CTA's Orange Line. It is located between the neighborhoods of Brighton Park and Gage Park.

Bus connections
CTA
47 47th
51 51st
52 Kedzie
52A South Kedzie

Notes and references

Notes

References

External links 

Chicago "L".org Stations - Kedzie/49th

Kedzie Station Page CTA official site
Kedzie Avenue entrance from Google Maps Street View

CTA Orange Line stations
Railway stations in the United States opened in 1993
Former Grand Trunk Western Railroad stations